Events from the year 2014 in Sweden.

Incumbents
 Monarch – Carl XVI Gustaf
 Prime Minister – Fredrik Reinfeldt, Stefan Löfven

Events

March
 8–9 March – Knife attacks in the Möllevången neighbourhood of Malmö, in which neo-Nazis connected to the Party of the Swedes injure four people who had taken part in a demonstration celebrating International Women's Day that had just ended. Initial media reports of "a clash between leftwing and rightwing extremists" were widely condemned as misleading.
 16 March – Thousands demonstrate against fascism in Malmö, in response to the International Women's Day knife attacks the previous weekend.

July
31 July-11 August - 2014 Västmanland Wildfire.

September

 14 September – The 2014 Swedish general election

December
 2 December – 
 3 December – Prime Minister of Sweden Stefan Lofven calls a snap general election.
 9 December – The Pirate Bay website goes offline after Swedish police seize its servers.

Deaths

 6 January – Lena Smedsaas, journalist (b. 1951).
 11 February – Alice Babs, singer and actress (b. 1924).
 6 March – Barbro Kollberg, film actress (b. 1917).
 7 July – Bertil Haase, modern pentathlete (b. 1923).
 25 August – Lars Mortimer, comic artist (b. 1946).
 29 August
 Brasse Brännström, actor and screenwriter (b. 1945).
 Björn Waldegård, rally driver (b. 1943).
 12 September – Bengt Saltin, professor of human physiology (b. 1935).
 29 October – Klas Ingesson, footballer (b. 1968).
 21 December – Åke Johansson, footballer (b. 1928).

See also
 2014 in Swedish television

References

 
Years of the 21st century in Sweden
2010s in Sweden
Sweden
Sweden